Cropping refers to chopping off part of something.  

Image cropping

Docking of animals' tails and ears

It may also mean:
Crop farming